The Scottish National Movement (SNM) was a political organisation which campaigned for Scottish independence in the 1920s. It amalgamated with other Scottish nationalist bodies in 1928 to form the National Party of Scotland.

A breakaway from the Scots National League, the SNM was a small, Edinburgh-based group led by Lewis Spence. Like Spence, its followers were mainly literary figures evincing a romantic, nostalgic nationalism typical of the period. The SNM aimed to re-establish a Scottish Parliament and an independent state within the British Empire. As a matter of tactics, it gave its support to any measure directed towards Home Rule. It was active in the negotiations from which the National Party of Scotland emerged, and into which the SNM merged.

Further reading
 Barberis, Peter, McHugh, John and Tyldesley, Mike, Encyclopedia of British and Irish Political Organizations, Bloomsbury, 2005
 Brand, Jack, The National Movement in Scotland, Routledge and Kegan Paul, 1978
 Richard J. Finlay, Independent and Free: Scottish Politics and the Origins of the Scottish National Party 1918-1945, John Donald Publishers, 1994
 Hanham, H.J., Scottish Nationalism, Harvard University Press, 1969
 Christopher Harvie, Scotland and Nationalism: Scottish Society and Politics 1707 to the Present, Routledge (4th edition), 2004
 Lynch, Peter, SNP: The History of the Scottish National Party, Welsh Academic Press, 2002
 John MacCormick, The Flag in the Wind: The Story of the National Movement in Scotland, Victor Gollancz Ltd, 1955

References

1926 establishments in Scotland
1928 disestablishments in Scotland
Political history of Scotland
Political movements in Scotland
Scottish National Party
Scottish nationalist organisations
Organisations based in Edinburgh